Susan Aitken (born November 1971) is a Scottish politician who has served as Leader of Glasgow City Council since 2017. A member of the Scottish National Party, she has been the leader of the SNP group on the council since 2014 and a councillor for the Langside ward since 2012.

Early life
Aitken was born in Biggar, Lanarkshire in November 1971 to Glaswegian parents. After attending Biggar High School, she studied English Literature at the University of Glasgow before completing a Masters Degree at the neighbouring University of Strathclyde.

Originally a member of Scottish Labour, she joined the SNP in 2000, while working as a researcher in the field of health and social policy.

Political career

Election to city council
Aitken was elected to represent the ward of Langside in the 2012 Glasgow City Council election. In March 2014, she was made leader of the SNP Group at Glasgow City Council following the resignation of Graeme Hendry.

She was re-elected as a councillor at the 2017 Glasgow City Council election where the SNP became the largest party: breaking 36 years of uninterrupted Labour Party control of Scotland's largest city. Cllr Aitken became Leader of the Council, at the head of a minority SNP administration.

City council leader, 2017―present

Aitken took office as leader of the SNP-led administration on 9 May 2017, formally appointed as such on 18 May 2017, and immediately wrote to COSLA on behalf of Glasgow City Council, seeking to rejoin.

On 19 January 2019, Councillor Aitken’s administration announced that it would meet equal pay settlements after Court of Session ruled against Glasgow City Council in a long-running legal dispute which had begun under the previous administration, and which had been a central part of the SNP's 2017 manifesto. Workers later took part in industrial action with support of the GMB and Unison unions over delays to agree compensation payments and a new pay and benefits scheme.

Controversies

Refuse row

In the run up to the 2021 United Nations Climate Change Conference, which was hosted by Glasgow, Aitken was widely criticised for the general appearance of the city, with many residents concerned about an increase in fly-tipping and rubbish around the city's streets. Aitken denied there was a refuse issue, claiming that Glasgow "looks great" which led to her being branded "out of touch".

Concerns also arose relating to the level of graffiti across the city, something Aitken said that Glasgow City Council was dealing with. Scottish Labour leader and Glasgow MSP Anas Sarwar said “Aitken needs to stop blaming Glaswegians for her own failures", leading a spokesperson for Glasgow City Council to issue a statement which supported Aitken, claiming "Far from dismissing the other user's concerns, Councillor Aitken repeatedly encourages them to report incidents of flytipping, graffiti and environmental damage".

In October 2021, when questioned by the Scottish Affairs Select Committee about council workers who had been attacked by vermin whilst collecting waste, Aitken replied: "All cities have rats." She also suggested that Glasgow's waste problems were the fault of former British Prime Minister Margaret Thatcher.

Proposed closure of libraries

During the COVID-19 pandemic, libraries across Glasgow closed along with other businesses. During this time, Glasgow City Council had proposed a number of closures across the city's libraries, leading to backlash from the public, campaigners and other politicians. Aitken had earlier issued assurances that no libraries across the city would close.

Personal life

Aitken lives in the Southside of Glasgow with her husband.

In 2020, Aitken was referred to the Standards Commissioner by her predecessor Frank McAveety over allegations she should have declared an interest over a £1 a year rent given to a Community interest company her husband was involved in. Aitken was later found to have broken no conflict of interest rules, having had no locus in the matter, and the Standards Commissioner cleared Aitken of any wrongdoing.

References

External links
 Profile on Glasgow City Council website

Living people
1971 births
Scottish National Party councillors
Leaders of local authorities of Scotland
Politicians from South Lanarkshire
Alumni of the University of Strathclyde
Alumni of the University of Glasgow
Women councillors in Glasgow
People from Biggar, South Lanarkshire